Meall a' Bhuachaille is a mountain in the Cairngorms in Scotland. It is situated 10 km east of Aviemore, to the north of Loch Morlich and Glenmore Forest.

Ascent
The most popular route up Meall a' Bhuachaille starts from Loch Morlich. A path goes through the forest, and up onto the moor to the pass between Meall a' Bhuachaille and Creagan Gorm, then up to the summit. Another route is through the Ryvoan Pass, past An Lochan Uaine, to the bothy. From there, a path heads west up Meall a' Bhuachaille. The ascent of Meall a' Bhuachaille can also be combined with the summits of Creagan Gorm and Craiggowrie, which form a ridge to the west.

Hill race
A hill running race has been held on Meall a' Bhuachaille for a number of years. The current route starts and finishes at Badaguish Outdoor Centre; the previous route was from Glenmore Lodge.

External links
  Virtual 360 Tour of Meall a' Bhuachaille Hill Race.

References

Corbetts
Marilyns of Scotland
Mountains and hills of the Cairngorms
Mountains and hills of Highland (council area)